The Synod of Thionville was an important synod (or council) of ecclesiastic dignitaries of the Carolingian Empire in 835.
 
Three years after the sons of the emperor rose in rebellion against their father, Emperor Louis the Pious, in 830, Ebbo, Archbishop of Rheims, had turned against him and on 13 November 833, presided at the shameful scene enacted in the Church of St. Mary at Soissons, where the aged emperor was deposed and compelled to perform public penance for crimes which he had not committed. As a reward for this disgraceful act Ebbo had received the rich Abbey of St. Vaast from Lothaire and continued to support the rebellious Lothaire even after Louis had been solemnly reinstated in March 834. Being prevented by a severe attack of the gout from following Lothaire to Italy he took refuge in the cell of a hermit near Paris, but was found out and sent as prisoner to the  Abbey of Fulda. On 2 February 835, Ebbo appeared at the Synod of Thionville, where in the presence of the emperor and forty-three bishops he solemnly declared the monarch innocent of the crimes of which he had accused him at Soissons, and on 28 February 835 made a public recantation from the pulpit of the cathedral of Metz.

The synod also deposed Louis' other staunchest rivals within the church: Agobard, Archbishop of Lyon, Bernard, Bishop of Vienne, and Bartholomew, Archbishop of Narbonne. The synod represented a reversal of that of Soissons of 13 November 833, in which Ebbo had deposed Louis.

Sources and references
(incomplete)
 
Thionville

Carolingian Empire
Christianity in the Holy Roman Empire
History of Catholicism in France
9th-century church councils
835
9th century in France